Samuel Bell (fl. 1850s) was a California political figure from Mariposa County. He served as a Democrat in the California State Assembly in 1853 and was Controller of California from 1854 to 1856.

Year of birth missing
Year of death missing
State Controllers of California
Democratic Party members of the California State Assembly
People from Mariposa County, California